Baygildino (Baygilde) is a rural locality (a selo) and the administrative centre of Baygildinsky Selsoviet, Nurimanovsky District, Bashkortostan, Russia. The population was 432 as of 2010. There are 12 streets.

Geography 
Baygildino is located 30 km southwest of Krasnaya Gorka (the district's administrative centre) by road. Malotenkashevo is the nearest rural locality.

References 

Rural localities in Nurimanovsky District